The Goa women's cricket team is a women's cricket team representing the Indian state of Goa. The team competes in the Women's Senior One Day Trophy and the Women's Senior T20 Trophy.

See also
 Goa cricket team

References

Cricket in Goa
Women's cricket teams in India